Garryspillane ( meaning "the garden of Ó Spealáin"), sometimes spelled "Garryspellane", is a village in southern County Limerick, Ireland, located near Knocklong on the R513 road. It is around 15 km west of Tipperary Town. Amenities in the village include a pub, a garage (service station), and a co-op. The Morning Star River flows near the village. It is a mainly agricultural area.

Sport
The local hurling team is known as Garryspillane, although the pitch is located in the nearby village of Knocklong.

See also
List of towns and villages in Ireland

References

Towns and villages in County Limerick